The 2015–16 Dutch Basketball League season was the 56th season of the Dutch Basketball League, the highest professional basketball league in the Netherlands. The seasons started on October 6, 2015 and ended May 27, 2016. The defending champion was SPM Shoeters Den Bosch. Donar won its fifth national title, after beating Landstede 1–4 in the Final.

Import players
Each team was allowed to play with a maximum of four foreign players, according to DBL regulations.

Teams

On June 18, 2015, it was announced that all teams from the 2014–15 season would return.

Personnel and kits

Managerial changes

Regular season

Standings

Playoffs

Final standings

Awards
The award winners were announced on April 16.

Statistical leaders
To be included a player had to have played at least 70% of his teams number of games.

|  style="width:50%; vertical-align:top;"|

Points

|}
|}

|  style="width:50%; vertical-align:top;"|

Assists

|}
|}

References

Dutch Basketball League seasons
1
Netherlands